Trichorhina tomentosa, known informally as the dwarf white isopod, is a species of woodlouse in the family Platyarthridae. It is a parthenogenetic species, and only female individuals are known. Native to tropical regions throughout the Americas, dwarf white isopods have been introduced to other tropical regions worldwide.

Description
They are uniformly white in color, and like other members in its family, cannot roll into a ball. Like many other woodlice, dwarf white isopods prefer moist soil, feeding on detritus. Dwarf white isopods give birth asexually.

Relationship with humans

As clean-up crews
Due to their prolific nature, ease of care, and ability to consume waste, dwarf white isopods are widely favored and used in bioactive setups, along with other isopods and springtails. Not only are they used as clean-up crews; they may also provide a food source for other terrarium animals, such as dart frogs and geckos.

References 

Woodlice
Crustaceans described in 1893